Rundu State Hospital is a government hospital in Rundu, Namibia. Containing 300 beds, it was remodeled from 1991 to 1997.

References

Rundu
Hospitals in Namibia